Shaun Lightman (born 15 April 1943) is a retired British international racewalker.

Athletics career
He competed in the men's 50 kilometres walk at the 1968 Summer Olympics.

He represented England in the 20 miles walk, at the 1970 British Commonwealth Games in Edinburgh, Scotland.

References

1943 births
Living people
Athletes (track and field) at the 1968 Summer Olympics
British male racewalkers
Olympic athletes of Great Britain
Athletes (track and field) at the 1970 British Commonwealth Games
Commonwealth Games competitors for England